Bolton-le-Sands is a large village and civil parish of the City of Lancaster in Lancashire, England. The parish had a population of 4,098 recorded in the  2001 census, increasing to 4,127 at the 2011 Census.

Referred to as Bodeltone in the Domesday book, the village was known as Bolton until the arrival of the railways, when the name was changed to Bolton-le-Sands to differentiate from similarly named towns on the same line, such as Bolton which was then a part of Lancashire and called Bolton-le-Moors.

The oldest church in the village, founded prior to 1094, is the Church of England Holy Trinity church, originally dedicated to St Michael. The oldest part of the current building is the tower, supposed to have been built around 1500. The nave and chancel date from the 19th century. The other churches are the Roman Catholic St Mary of the Angels and the Christ Church United Reformed Church.

The Lancaster Canal, built in the 1790s, is a major feature of the village. Also passing through the village is the A6 and the West Coast Main Line, although its railway station closed in 1969.

The village includes three pubs: The Royal Hotel, situated on the A6, The Packet Boat (closed in 2015), and the Blue Anchor are both within the centre of the village, along the main street.

The village has one school, Bolton-le-Sands Church of England Primary School, with 320 pupils from the ages of 4 to 11 in a modern school building.
It has received a 2022 Ofsted report with GOOD in all areas. 
The school is a successor to the old Boys' Free Grammar School, which dates from 1657, with the 19th century school building still used for community education. The school building was also home to the Bolton-le-Sands library until 1973, when the library was moved into a newly built site in the village centre.  The library was controversially closed in Autumn 2016 following a renovation in 2015 costing a reported £283,000.

The village has a very active scout group that meets in the scout hut on the village playing fields. It has three sections; Beavers, Cubs and Scouts.

Governance
An electoral ward with the same name exists. This ward stretches beyond the confines of the parish with a total population taken at the 2011 census of 4,255.

See also

Listed buildings in Bolton-le-Sands

Notes

External links

Geography 

Villages in Lancashire
Geography of the City of Lancaster
Populated coastal places in Lancashire
Civil parishes in Lancashire
Morecambe Bay